The College Hero is a 1927 American silent comedy film directed by Walter Lang. This is a surviving title contrary to some reports, as it is on video.

Plot
Football player Bob Cantfield enrolls at Carver College, is assigned Jim Halloran as a roommate and lands a date with Sampson Saunders' attractive sister, Vivian.

Jim's jealousy over Bob's gridiron and girlfriend successes cause him to trip his teammate deliberately and cause Bob to be injured in a game. Bob is still able to score the touchdown that wins Carver the game, after which Jim's conscience gets the better of him.

Cast
 Pauline Garon as Vivian Saunders
 Ben Turpin as The Janitor
 Robert Agnew as Bob Cantfield (as Bobbie Agnew)
 Rex Lease as Jim Halloran
 Churchill Ross as Sampson Saunders
 Joan Standing as Nellie Kelly
 Charles Paddock as The Coach

References

External links
 
 

1927 films
1927 comedy films
American black-and-white films
Silent American comedy films
American football films
American silent feature films
Columbia Pictures films
1920s English-language films
Films directed by Walter Lang
Films set in universities and colleges
1920s American films